Brunellia boqueronensis is a species of plant in the Brunelliaceae family. It is endemic to Colombia.

References

boqueronensis
Vulnerable plants
Endemic flora of Colombia
Taxonomy articles created by Polbot